Tippy Lemmey is a 2003 chapter book by Patricia McKissack about three children,  Leandra, Paul, and Jeannie, who are terrorised by a neighborhood dog, called Tippy Lemmey, but manage to overcome their fears and befriend him.

Reception
A review of Tippy Lemmey by the School Library Journal wrote "This charming and humorous story moves along at a fast pace, making it perfect for readers just venturing into chapter-book territory. Evocative black-and-white illustrations effectively portray the children's changing perceptions of Tippy Lemmey. A delightful addition to any collection." and Booklist  called it a "pleasing Ready-for-Chapters book that will appeal to fans of both animal stories and realistic fiction."

The Horn Book Magazine wrote "This is a terrific read-aloud, but why bother? Get Tippy Lemmey into one kid's hands and it will be the pass-it-on hit of the summer reading club."

Tippy Lemmey has also been reviewed by  Kirkus Reviews. 

It was a 2005 Texas Bluebonnet Award nominee.

References

2003 children's books
American children's books
Fictional dogs
Books by Patricia McKissack
Aladdin Paperbacks books